Oliver Almond was a Roman Catholic priest and writer, born in the diocese of Oxford. He is believed by Foley to have been the brother of the martyr, the Ven. John Almond; but Gillow has shown that this is probably a mistake.

Biography

Oliver was educated at the English Colleges at Rome (1582–87) and Valladolid, and was a missionary in England.
He was made George Birkhead 's assistant in Staffordshire in September of 1612 instead of Ralph Stamford. After a year Birkhead substituted him because Almond had been arrested and imprisoned. In July 1613 he was released for a sum of money. 
He presented the English College at Rome with a precious chalice. Some of his correspondence is preserved in the Westminster Archives, and he is conjectured by Gillow to have been the writer of a work entitled The Uncasing of Heresies, or the Anatomie of Protestancie, written and composed by O.A. (Leuven/Louvain?) 1623, 8vo.

References

Henry Foley, Records S.J., VI., 153
Gillow, Joseph, Bibl. Dict. Eng. Cath., I, 27
Stonyhurst Mss. Collectanea, N. ii, 73.

External links

16th-century births
16th-century English Roman Catholic priests
English College, Rome alumni
Year of death unknown
People from Oxford
16th-century English writers
16th-century male writers